Hertfordshire is a county in eastern England. It is bordered by Bedfordshire to the north, Cambridgeshire to the north-east, Essex to the east, Buckinghamshire to the west and Greater London to the south. The county town is Hertford.

Local nature reserves (LNRs) are designated by local authorities under the National Parks and Access to the Countryside Act 1949. The local authority must have legal control over the site, by owning or leasing it or having an agreement with the owner. LNRs are sites which have a special local interest either biologically or geologically, and local authorities have a duty to care for them. They can apply local bye-laws to manage and protect LNRs.

As of July 2015, forty-two LNRs in Hertfordshire have been notified to Natural England. It has some of the richest chalk grassland in England, and it is also a Site of Special Scientific Interest (SSSI). The smallest is Oxleys Wood in Hatfield, which has an area of only . This wood often floods, and it provides a habitat for a wide range of insects and birds. Several other sites are also SSSIs, such as Croxley Common Moor and Sherrardspark Wood. The oldest LNR in Hertfordshire listed by Natural England is Hilfield Park Reservoir, declared in 1969, and the newest Weston Hills in 2012.

Key

Other classifications
 CAONB = Chilterns Area of Outstanding Natural Beauty
 HMWT = Herts and Middlesex Wildlife Trust
 SSSI = Site of Special Scientific Interest

Sites

See also

List of Sites of Special Scientific Interest in Hertfordshire
Herts and Middlesex Wildlife Trust
List of local nature reserves in England

Notes

References

 
Hertfordshire
Hertfordshire-related lists